Paolo Dall'Oglio (born November 17, 1954) is an Italian Jesuit priest and peace activist. He was exiled from Syria by the government in 2012 for meeting with members of the opposition and criticizing the alleged actions of the Syrian government during the Syrian civil war. He was kidnapped by Islamic State of Iraq and the Levant on 29 July 2013.

He has been credited with the reconstruction of the Mar Musa complex and its reinvention as a centre of interfaith dialogue.

In February 2019, news emerged that he may still be alive inside Deir ez-Zor Governorate, Syria.

Biography
In 1975, Paolo Dall'Oglio joined the Jesuit order. He spent his novitiate in Italy before starting university studies of Arabic language and Islamic studies in Beirut, Lebanon, and Damascus, Syria.

In 1982, he explored the ruins of the old Syriac Monastery of Saint Moses the Abyssinian (Deir Mar Musa) that can be traced back to the 6th century and had been abandoned since the 19th century.

In 1984, Dall'Oglio was ordained priest in the Syriac Catholic rite. In the same year, he obtained a degree in Arabic language and Islamic studies from Naples Eastern University "L'Orientale" and in Catholic theology from the Pontifical Gregorian University.

In 1986, he obtained another master's degree in Missiology from the Pontifical Gregorian University.

In 1989, he obtained a PhD degree from the Pontifical Gregorian University. He wrote his doctoral dissertation on the topic "About Hope in Islam".

In 1992, with deacon Jacques Mourad, Paolo “officially” founded under the authority of the Syriac Catholic Church a double monastic community (men and women, which is normally contrary to the XX canon of the Second Council of Nicaea), named "the Al-Khalil Monastic Community of Deir Mar Moussa al-Habashi", devoted to four tasks: prayer (in Arabic salat), work (amal), hospitality (dayafa) and dialogue (hiwar), dedicated to Muslim-Christian dialogue.

In 2009, Dall'Oglio obtained the double honorary doctorate of the Université catholique de Louvain and the KU Leuven.

He contributed regularly to the magazine "Popoli", the international magazine of the Italian Jesuits, established in 1915.

Role in the Syrian civil war
In 2011, Dall'Oglio wrote an article pleading for a peaceful democratic transition in Syria, based on what he called "consensual democracy". He also met with opposition activists and participated in the funeral service for the 28-year-old Christian filmmaker Bassel Shehadeh, who had been murdered in Homs.

The Syrian government reacted sharply and issued an expulsion order. Dall'Oglio ignored the order for a couple of months and continued living in Syria. However, following the publication of an open letter to UN special envoy Kofi Annan in May 2012, he obeyed his bishop who urged him to leave the country. He left Syria on 12 June 2012 and joined in exile the newly established Deir Maryam al-Adhra of his community in Sulaymaniyah, Iraqi Kurdistan.

In December 2012, Dall'Oglio was awarded the Peace Prize of the Italian region of Lombardy that is dedicated to persons having done extraordinary work in the field of peacebuilding.

In late July 2013 Dall'Oglio entered rebel held territory in eastern Syria but was soon kidnapped by the militants of the Islamic State of Iraq and the Levant, while walking in Raqqa on 29 July. Opposition sources from Raqqa said that Paolo Dall'Oglio has been executed by the extremist group  and his body thrown into a ground hole in the city of Raqqa, called “Al-Houta”. Dead Assad loyalist soldiers would have often been thrown into the same hole. The claims are not yet confirmed.

However, the Rewards for Justice Program offers $5 million for information on ISIS network responsible for kidnapping Christian clerics: Maher Mahfouz, Michael Kayyal, Yohanna Ibrahim, Boulos Yazigi, and Paolo Dall’Oglio.

Selected bibliography
  Speranza nell'Islam: Interpretazione della prospettiva escatologica di Corano XVIII, 365 pp., Marietti, Milano 1991, 
  Amoureux de l'islam, croyant en Jésus, in cooperation with Églantine Gabaix-Hialé, preface by Régis Debray, 190 pp., Les Editions de l'Atelier, Paris 2009, 
  La sete di Ismaele. Siria, diario monastico islamo-cristiano, Gabrielli Editori, Verona 2011, 
  La démocratie consensuelle, pour l’unité nationale, 27 July 2011, published on the official website of the monastery of Mar Musa
  La rage et la lumière, in cooperation with Églantine Gabaix-Hialé, Les Editions de l'Atelier, Paris, May 2013

See also
Frans van der Lugt

References

Further reading

 Shaun O'Neill, A Church of Islam: The Syrian Calling of Father Paolo Dall'Oglio Wipf and Stock Oregon 2019. A summary of the Italian's life and spiritual quest to the Levant, including his political views on the Syrian Civil War and tragic fate in 2013.
 Marius Kociejowski, The Street Philosopher and the Holy Fool: A Syrian Journey Sutton Publishing Stroud 2004, contains a chapter on Paolo Dall'Oglio A Desert Father
 Guyonne de Montjou, Mar Moussa, un monastère, un homme, un désert (French edition), Albin Michel, Paris 2006
 Manoël Pénicaud, Paolo Dall'Oglio, le père bâtisseur, article in Le Monde des religions, No. 49, September–October 2011
 Dana Greene, Witness in the desert: Deir Mar Musa home to monastic community faithful to ideals of sixth-century founder, article in National Catholic Reporter, December 29, 2006
 "We Know We Have Brothers and Sisters in the Islamic Tradition", interview with Paolo Dall'Oglio, November 11, 2009
 Short biography of Paolo Dall'Oglio on the website of the Sham Spiritual Oasis project
Hoping for a Victory without Revenge Interview with Father Paolo Dall'Oglio on Syria, Qantara.

1954 births
21st-century Italian Jesuits
Italian expatriates in Syria
20th-century Italian Jesuits
Clergy from Rome
Pontifical Gregorian University alumni
Articles containing video clips
2013 deaths